Macedonia (officially under the provisional appellation "former Yugoslav Republic of Macedonia", abbreviated "FYR Macedonia") participated in the Eurovision Song Contest 2016 with the song "Dona" written by Kaliopi and Romeo Grill. The song was performed by Kaliopi, who was internally selected by the Macedonian broadcaster Macedonian Radio Television (MRT) to compete for Macedonia at the 2016 contest in Stockholm, Sweden. Kaliopi previously represented Macedonia in the Eurovision Song Contest 2012 with the song "Crno i belo", placing thirteenth in the final of the competition. At the time of Kaliopi's selection, the last time Macedonia qualified to compete in the final of the Eurovision Song Contest was when she represented the nation in 2012. Kaliopi's appointment as the Macedonian representative was announced on 24 November 2015, while her song, "Dona", was presented to the public in a television special titled Kaliopi za Makedonija ("Kaliopi for Macedonia") on 7 March 2016.

Macedonia was drawn to compete in the second semi-final of the Eurovision Song Contest which took place on 12 May 2016. Performing during the show in position 8, "Dona" was not announced among the top 10 entries of the second semi-final and therefore did not qualify to compete in the final. It was later revealed that Macedonia placed eleventh out of the 18 participating countries in the semi-final with 88 points.

Background

The nation's best result in the contest to this point was twelfth, which it achieved in 2006 with the song "Ninanajna" performed by Elena Risteska.

The Macedonian national broadcaster, Macedonian Radio Television (MRT), broadcasts the event within Macedonia and organises the selection process for the nation's entry. Macedonia had previously selected their entry for the Eurovision Song Contest through both national finals and internal selections. MRT confirmed their intentions to participate at the 2016 Eurovision Song Contest on 25 September 2015. Between 2008 and 2011, Macedonia selected their entries using the national final Skopje Fest. During this period, the nation failed to qualify to the final on every occasion. For 2015, the nation returned to using Skopje Fest as a national final, selecting Daniel Kajmakoski and the song "Autumn Leaves" as their entry. Their 2015 entry failed to qualify Macedonia to the final for a third consecutive year in a row. For 2016, the broadcaster opted to internally select the Macedonian entry.

Before Eurovision

Internal selection
On 24 November 2015, MRT announced that they had internally selected Kaliopi to represent Macedonia in Stockholm. Kaliopi previously competed in the contest in  where she performed the song "Crno i belo" and placed thirteenth in the final. In , she was also the proposed Macedonian entry with the song "Samo ti"; however, the entry was eliminated in an audio-only pre-qualifying round. Kaliopi had previously attempted to participate in the Eurovision Song Contest on several occasions. Her earliest attempt was in  when she competed in the Yugoslav national final with the song "Emanuel" which placed tenth.

On 16 February 2016, it was announced that Kaliopi would perform the song "Dona" at the Eurovision Song Contest 2016. "Dona" was presented to the public in a special show hosted by Marko Mark and Aleksandra Jovanovska titled Kaliopi za Makedonija ("Kaliopi for Macedonia"), which took place on 7 March 2016 and was broadcast on MRT 1, MRT Sat and online via the broadcaster's official website mrt.com.mk. In addition to presenting Kaliopi's 2016 Eurovision entry, the show was dedicated to Kaliopi's musical career and featured highlights from her previous Eurovision participation in 2012 as well as performances of songs from her repertoire together with several young musicians: Marijana Mariangel, David Temelkov, Ivona Jovanović, Ivana Naumova and Trajče Georgiev. In an interview for Macedonian newspaper Večer in November 2015, Kaliopi stated that her contest entry would be performed in Macedonian and that she would once again work with Romeo Grill, who composed her entry in 2012. Kaliopi wrote the lyrics for the song herself.

Promotion
Kaliopi made several appearances across Europe to specifically promote "Dona" as the Macedonian Eurovision entry. Between 21 March and 30 March, Kaliopi completed a tour of the ex-Yugoslav region, visiting Belgrade, Sarajevo, Ljubljana and Zagreb and giving interviews to media outlets and appearing during talk show programmes to discuss her Eurovision participation; Kaliopi performed "Dona" during the RTV SLO1 programme Vikend paket on 27 March. On 3 April, Kaliopi performed during the Eurovision Pre-Party, which was held at the Izvestia Hall in Moscow, Russia and hosted by Dmitry Guberniev. On 9 April, Kaliopi performed during the Eurovision in Concert event which was held at the Melkweg venue in Amsterdam, Netherlands and hosted by Cornald Maas and Hera Björk. On 12 April, Kaliopi completed promotional activities in Bulgaria. On 17 April, Kaliopi performed during the London Eurovision Party, which was held at the Café de Paris venue in London, United Kingdom and hosted by Nicki French and Paddy O'Connell. On 20 April, Kaliopi completed promotional activities in Albania where she provided media outlets with interviews, appeared during the TVSH programme Kolor and recorded a performance of "Dona" for the TV Klan programme E diela shqiptare, which was broadcast on 24 April.

At Eurovision

According to Eurovision rules, all nations with the exceptions of the host country and the "Big Five" (France, Germany, Italy, Spain and the United Kingdom) are required to qualify from one of two semi-finals in order to compete for the final; the top ten countries from each semi-final progress to the final. The European Broadcasting Union (EBU) split up the competing countries into six different pots based on voting patterns from previous contests, with countries with favourable voting histories put into the same pot. On 25 January 2016, a special allocation draw was held which placed each country into one of the two semi-finals, as well as which half of the show they would perform in. Macedonia was placed into the second semi-final, to be held on 12 May 2016, and was scheduled to perform in the first half of the show.

Once all the competing songs for the 2016 contest had been released, the running order for the semi-finals was decided by the shows' producers rather than through another draw, so that similar songs were not placed next to each other. Macedonia was set to perform in position 8, following the entry from Ireland and before the entry from Lithuania.

The two semi-finals and final were broadcast in Macedonia on MRT 1 with commentary by Karolina Petkovska. The Macedonian spokesperson, who announced the top 12-point score awarded by the Macedonian jury during the final, was Dijana Gogova.

Semi-final

Kaliopi took part in technical rehearsals on 4 and 7 May, followed by dress rehearsals on 11 and 12 May. This included the jury show on 11 May where the professional juries of each country watched and voted on the competing entries.

The Macedonian performance featured Kaliopi performing in a long black and white dress, designed by Roze Trajcevska, at the centre of the stage flanked by four backing vocalists on one side and a drummer on the other side. The stage colours were predominately black and white with the background LED screens displaying red designs during the final chorus. The drummer that joined Kaliopi on stage was Goran Mihajlovski and the four backing vocalists were Maja Sazdanovska, Marija Naumovska, Julija Karamitrova-Ognenoska and Kalina Velkovska.

At the end of the show, Macedonia was not announced among the top 10 entries in the second semi-final and therefore failed to qualify to compete in the final. It was later revealed that Macedonia placed eleventh in the semi-final, receiving a total of 88 points: 54 points from the televoting and 34 points from the juries.

Voting
Voting during the three shows was conducted under a new system that involved each country now awarding two sets of points from 1-8, 10 and 12: one from their professional jury and the other from televoting. Each nation's jury consisted of five music industry professionals who are citizens of the country they represent, with their names published before the contest to ensure transparency. This jury judged each entry based on: vocal capacity; the stage performance; the song's composition and originality; and the overall impression by the act. In addition, no member of a national jury was permitted to be related in any way to any of the competing acts in such a way that they cannot vote impartially and independently. The individual rankings of each jury member as well as the nation's televoting results were released shortly after the grand final.

Below is a breakdown of points awarded to Macedonia and awarded by Macedonia in the second semi-final and grand final of the contest, and the breakdown of the jury voting and televoting conducted during the two shows:

Points awarded to Macedonia

Points awarded by Macedonia

Detailed voting results
The following members comprised the Macedonian jury:
 Vanco Dimitrov (jury chairperson)composer, singer, music journalist and editor
  (Miyatta)singer, songwriter
 Goran Naumovskisinger
  (Prince)composer, producer, singer, guitar player, songwriter
 Nade Talevskasinger

References 

2016
Countries in the Eurovision Song Contest 2016
Eurovision